Koti Takar Prem (English: Million Dollars Love) is a Bangladeshi Bengali-language action romance film directed by Sohanur Rahman Sohan.  The film was produced by Sharif Udin Khan and features Shakib Khan, Apu Biswas and Misha Sawdagor in the lead roles.

Plot

Cast
 Shakib Khan
 Apu Biswas
 Misha Sawdagor
 Don
 Siraj Haider
 Abul Hayat
 Rina Khan
 Mizu Ahmed

Music
The film's music was directed by Shokit Ali Imon.

References

Further reading
 
 
 
 
 

2011 films
2010s romantic action films
Bengali-language Bangladeshi films
Bangladeshi romantic action films
Films scored by Shawkat Ali Emon
2010s Bengali-language films
Films directed by Sohanur Rahman Sohan